Universiti Teknologi MARA (UiTM) Cawangan Perlis (Jawi:   اونيۏرسيتي تيكنولوڬي مارا چاوڠن ڤرليس; Abbreviation: UiTM Perlis ) is one of the branch campus of Universiti Teknologi MARA located in Arau, Perlis, Malaysia. It was established in 1974 at Kangar, making it as the third oldest UiTM campus in the whole country. In 1980, the campus moved to their permanent location in Arau. Now, UiTM Perlis is the largest branch campus around the country, by the number of student and also the total courses offered.

History
Universiti Teknologi MARA (UiTM) has substantially evolved over the past 50 years through an era of continued progress. This includes the change in name from Institut Teknologi MARA to Universiti Teknologi MARA in 1999. Befitting the occasion, Seri Paduka Baginda Yang di-Pertuan Agong is designated the Chancellor of the university . As the third oldest branch campus, UiTM Perlis is also the largest UiTM branch campus, after the main campus in Shah Alam. It is a premier institution of higher learning in Perlis. It was officially established on 5 July 1974, with a pioneer intake 258 students, undergoing 1 preparatory course and 5 diploma programmes.

At its inception, there were 15 academic staff, assisted by 31 administrative and support staff. The campus then operated at a temporary site of the Scouts House at Padang Katong Road, Kangar. In 1980, the campus moved to its permanent site in Arau, on a 335-acre plot granted by the state government. The Raja Perlis and the state government, totalling 464 acres of campus land. 240 acres of this land are designated for farming and the agricultural unit for the purpose of education, research and as tourist attraction. In 2004, further 129 acres were allocated for research and development activities.

Faculties and academic centres 
There are 7 faculties and 35 programmes offered in UiTM Perlis:

Science
 Faculty of Architecture, Planning and Surveying (AP) 
 Faculty of Applied Science (AS) 
 Faculty of Plantation and Agrotechnology (AT)
 Faculty of Computer and Mathematical Sciences (CS) 
 Faculty of Sport and Recreational Sciences (SR) 

Business and Management
 Faculty of Accountancy (AC) 
 Faculty of Business Management (BM)

Programmes 
CS143 – Diploma in Mathematical Science

CS110 – Diploma in Computer Science

CS248 – Bachelor of Science (Hons) Management Mathematics

CS240 – Bachelor of Information Technology (Hons)

CS245 – Bachelor of Computer Science (Hons) Data Communication and Networking

CS251 – Bachelor of Computer Science (Hons) Netcentric Computing

AS113 – Diploma Teknologi Polimer

AS115 – Diploma Kimia Industri

AS120 – Diploma Sains

AS201 – Sarjana Muda (Kepujian) Biologi

AS202 – Sarjana Muda (Kepujian) Kimia

AS203 – Sarjana Muda (Kepujian) Fizik

AS243 – Sarjana Muda (Kepujian) Teknologi Polimer

AS245 – Sarjana Muda (Kepujian) Kimia Gunaan

AS254 – Sarjana Muda (Kepujian) Teknologi Marin

AT110 – Diploma Pengurusan Ladang

AT232 – Sarjana Muda Sains Agroteknologi (Kepujian) Teknologi Hortikultur

SR111 – Diploma Pengurusan Sukan & Rekreasi

SR113 – Diploma Pengajian Sukan

SR241 – Sarjana Muda (Kepujian) Pengurusan Sukan

SR243 – Sarjana Muda (Kepujian) Sains Sukan

SR245 – Sarjana Muda (Kepujian) Kesihatan & Kecergasan

BA240 – Ijazah Sarjana Muda Pentadbiran Perniagaan (Kepujian) Pemasaran

BA242 – Ijazah Sarjana Muda Pentadbiran Perniagaan (Kepujian) Kewangan

BA243 – Ijazah Sarjana Muda Pentadbiran Perniagaan (Kepujian) Pengurusan Sumber Manusia

AP120 – Diploma Sains Geomatik

AC120 – Diploma Sistem Maklumat Perakaunan

Notes

References

1974 establishments in Malaysia
Arau
Universiti Teknologi MARA
Universities and colleges in Perlis
Educational institutions established in 1974